Norman Morrell (17 July 1912 – December 2000) was a British wrestler. He competed in two evens at the 1936 Summer Olympics.

References

External links
 

1912 births
2000 deaths
British male sport wrestlers
Olympic wrestlers of Great Britain
Wrestlers at the 1936 Summer Olympics
Sportspeople from Bradford